Bink Video is a proprietary file format (extensions .bik and .bk2) for video developed by Epic Games Tools (formerly RAD Game Tools), a part of Epic Games.

Overview 
The format includes its own proprietary video and audio compression algorithms (video and audio codecs) supporting resolutions from 320×240 up to high definition video.

It is bundled as part of the Epic Video Tools along with Epic Game Tools' previous video codec, Smacker video. It is a hybrid block-transform and wavelet codec using 16 different encoding techniques. The codec places emphasis on lower decoding requirements over other video codecs with specific optimizations for the different computer game consoles it supports.

It has been primarily used for full-motion video sequences in video games, and has been used in games for Windows, Mac OS and all sixth-generation game consoles (Dreamcast, GameCube, PlayStation 2 and Xbox) and all major seventh-generation gaming platforms (Nintendo DS, PlayStation 3, PlayStation Portable, Wii and Xbox 360).

The format was reverse-engineered by the FFmpeg project and Bink decoding is supported by the open-source libavcodec library.

It was inducted into the Front Line Awards Hall of Fame by the Game Developer magazine in 2009. The winners for the award were published in the January 2010 issue of the magazine.

Bink 2, a new version of the format, was released in 2013. This new format is available for Windows (standard, Windows 8 Store and Windows 8 Phone), Mac OS, Linux, major touchscreen smartphone platforms (Android and iOS), all three major seventh-generation consoles (PlayStation 3, Wii, Xbox 360), all major eighth-generation platforms except the Nintendo 3DS (Nintendo Switch, PlayStation 4, PlayStation Vita, Wii U and Xbox One) and the ninth-generation PlayStation 5 and Xbox Series X/S. Bink 2 is faster than Bink 1, and supports higher resolutions as well.

Epic Games acquired the technology and business of RAD Game Tools including Bink on January 7, 2021, renaming it to Epic Games Tools. It was announced they planned to integrate RAD's technology directly into Unreal Engine and that licenses will continue to be available to those who do not use the Unreal Engine in their work.

See also 
 Miles Sound System

References

External links 
 
 Games using Bink Video
 Bink Video - MultimediaWiki

Digital container formats
Video codecs
Epic Games